Nitriliruptor alkaliphilus is a non-spore-forming and non-motile bacterium from the genus Nitriliruptor which has been isolated from sediments from a soda lake in Siberia in Russia.

References

External links 
Type strain of Nitriliruptor alkaliphilus at BacDive –  the Bacterial Diversity Metadatabase

Actinomycetota
Bacteria described in 2009